Dhruv Bhandari (born 13 July 1985) is an Indian actor who has appeared in films and TV series such as Rakt Sambandh and Star Plus's Tere Sheher Mein.

His father is Mohan Bhandari.

Personal life 
Dhruv Bhandari was born on 13 July 1985 in Mumbai. His bachelor's degree is in mass media. He has also done a lot of theater workshops and is  a trained dancer.

Dhruv Bhandari was born to Mohan Bhandari who was a talented actor. Mohan had a brain tumour and died on 25 September 2015 at the age of 78. He appeared as the lovable father in a popular show on Zee TV titled Saat Phere: Saloni Ka Safar.

Filmography

Film
Click (2010 film)
Dil Toh Baccha Hai Ji (2011, cameo)
Pathayeram Kodi (2013, as Ashwin)

Television
Rakt Sambandh (2010 – 2011, as Yuvraj Jagirdar)
Tere Sheher Mein (2015, as Abhimanyu (Mantu) Srivastav - lead role)
Bindiya Sarkaar (2022, as Abhay Bharadwaj - lead role)

Career 
Dhruv was seen in an ad with Sachin Tendulkar for Luminous invertors and was also part of an ad campaign for McDonald's for four months.

Dhruv made his television debut in the show, 'Rakt Sambandh' on Imagine TV where he played the role of Yuvraaj. He was supposed to start his career with Manish Goswami's 'Sixer' which was loosely based on Sachin Tendulkar but the project was shelved. He next appeared in the movie 'Dil Toh Baccha Hai Ji' alongside Ajay Devgan where he played the role of Chris the cool dude. He bagged his first single lead in 'Pathaayiram Kodi', a Tamil film, directed by Sreenivasan Sundar.

Tere Sheher Mein 
Tere Sheher Mein was a popular TV show aired on Star Plus by Director's Kut Productions (production house of Rajan Shahi). Dhruv Bhandari played the lead role of Mantu alongside Hiba Nawab as Amaya Mathur in the show. Dhruv Bhandari quit the show because Mantu, who is in love with Amaya, in the coming days would have seen a shift in his personality to negative after a sudden story change in which Amaya is forced to marry Mantu's childhood friend, Rama. Dhruv thought otherwise and chose to opt out instead of playing a negative role.

References

External links
 

21st-century Indian male actors
Place of birth missing (living people)
Indian male television actors
Indian male film actors
Living people
1985 births